Jermano Lo Fo Sang (born 11 November 1991) is a Dutch professional football players who plays as a left-back for VVSB in the Derde Divisie.

Club career
Played in the youth academies of Ajax and Haarlem. When the club went bankrupt in 2010, he came to Zeeburgia where he left quickly. He played indoor football at ZVV ter Beek Amsterdam in Diemen and ended up at OFC Oostzaan in 2011. He played there for three years and promoted from the third class to the main class. Then in the summer of 2014 he was attracted by Volendam, then in the Eerste Divisie.

Made her debut on 15 August 2014 in professional football. On that day, Volendam lost 0–2 in his own home from NEC Nijmegen. Lo Fo Sang came in for 82 minutes for Oscar Wilffert. Lo Fo Sang extended his contract at Volendam in mid-August 2015 until mid-2017, with an option for another year. At the beginning of 2017, his contract was immediately terminated due to, among other things, private circumstances. In the summer of 2017, he spent two weeks at AFC before they split up. In January 2018, Lo Fo Sang joined the Austrian FC Karabakh Wien.

At the end of November 2018 it was confirmed, that Lo Fo Sang would return to OFC Oostzaan for the second half of the season. In the summer 2021, he moved to Olympia Haarlem. In February 2022, he joined VVSB.

References

External links
 

1991 births
Living people
Dutch footballers
Dutch expatriate footballers
Footballers from Amsterdam
AFC Ajax players
HFC Haarlem players
Amsterdamsche FC players
FC Volendam players
FC Mauerwerk players
OFC Oostzaan players
VVSB players
Eerste Divisie players
Association football defenders
Dutch expatriate sportspeople in Austria
Expatriate footballers in Austria